USS Energy is a name used more than once by the U.S. Navy:

 , a coastal minesweeper commissioned 1 January 1942.
 , a fleet minesweeper commissioned 16 July 1954.

United States Navy ship names